Osman I of Fehendhoo was the Sultan of the Maldives in 1388.  He ruled the country for 6 months and 15 days.  Sultan Osmaan was also the last sultan to ascend the throne of the Maldives from the Lunar Dynasty, ending the 227 years of Lunar Dynasty rule since the Maldives converted to Islam from Buddhism.

Sultan Osmaan I was forced to abdicate and banished to Kolhumadulu Atoll Guraidhoo, where he would die. His tomb was found in 1922, now in the Guraidhoo Ziyaaraiy Mosque

References
 

14th-century sultans of the Maldives